Christiaensen Glacier is a glacier that drains westward between Mount Eyskens and Mount Derom, in the Queen Fabiola Mountains. It was discovered on October 7, 1960 by the Belgian Antarctic Expedition under Guido Derom, who named it for Leo Christiaensen, captain of the polar vessel Erika Dan which brought the Belgian expedition to Antarctica.

See also
 List of glaciers in the Antarctic
 Glaciology

References
 

Glaciers of Queen Maud Land
Prince Harald Coast